Isfahan university of technology (IUT) Dāneshgāh-e San'ati-ye Esfahān) is one of the pioneers among Iran's public universities and is located near the city of Isfahan, Isfahan province. IUT has 14 faculties and departments with about 11,000 students and 600 academic members and offers four disciplines of engineering, basic sciences, agriculture and Natural resources in all three study levels of BSc, MSc and PhD. It is first Iranian university that was allowed CERN membership.

Overview 
Isfahan University of Technology, started its academic activities in 1977. It is located in the central part of the country with the total area of 2300 hectares. Of this, 400 ha area has been dedicated to the main campus. The main campus resembling a small town, includes all the educational or research building as well as modern dormitories to house more than 5000 students and the residential quarters which provide the academic staff with semi-detached houses. To facilitate for students and staff, IUT also offers the health service center, shopping, sports and recreation centers inside the campus. IUT comprises a College of Agriculture (with ten departments), nine Engineering departments, three basic science departments, one department of natural resources with three divisions, seven research centers, and many research groups. Since it is located at the heart of industrial complexes, it has provided an opportunity to strengthen industrial enhancement of the city of Isfahan and Iran. The university has been successful enough to make strong ties with industries and carried out about 2000 research projects with different national industrial bodies. In terms of technology we have the honor to be the initiator of Isfahan Science and Technology Town (ISTT) which is one of the top in the Middle East. The connection between IUT and ISTT is leading to the enhancement of the cooperation between IUT and Industrial bodies in the region for more research projects, defining curriculum based on the industrial needs, providing the opportunities for students to get experienced about solving real problems based on the needs of society, such as training programs for educating our students and graduates to become entrepreneurs.

History
The university was founded in 1974 and admitted its first students in 1977. It was founded as Aryamehr University of Technology Isfahan branch, with a significant gift of approximately 2 million square meters or 500 acres of land being contributed to the university by the locally notable and well regarded Boroumand family (brothers Abdolghaffar, Abdolrahman, Abdolrahim, Abdolkarim, Abdolrashid, and Abdollah); the university was renamed after the Islamic Revolution of Iran. Plans to make the institution the largest university in the Middle East were not achieved because of political changes in the country.

Isfahan University of Technology is a state university under the supervision of the Ministry of Science, Research, and Technology. IUT began its academic activities in 1977 with around 800 students in five departments; the enrollment has grown to 10,000 in fourteen departments.

The university was designed and planned based on models of MIT and University of Illinois Urbana-Champaign.

Academics
Many of the country's brightest talents choose IUT among their first choices in National University Entrance Exams.

The university runs two research centers, the Information & Communication Technology Institute, and the Subsea Research & Development Center, where the first national radar project and design, and implementation of the first Iranian submarine were carried out.

World rankings

Islamic World Science Citation Center (ISC)

The Islamic World Science Citation Center (ISC) published rankings for 2018 of Iranian universities and institutes of higher education appears as follows (after Amirkabir University of Technology and before Iran University of Science and Technology):

University of Tehran 	
Sharif University of Technology 	                
Amirkabir University of Technology 	               
Isfahan University of Technology
Iran University of Science and Technology   
Tarbiat Modarres University    
Shiraz University	                                
Ferdowsi University of Mashhad	              
K. N. Toosi University of Technology
University of Tabriz

Academic Ranking of World Universities
 2011-2015:  Not mentioned

Times Higher Education

According to subject category of Times Higher Education 2020, IUT is:

 Ranked first in the country for Agricultural, Forestry, Environmental and Marine Sciences fields;
 Ranked 2nd in the country for life sciences;
 Ranked 3rd in the country for International Outlook and Industry Income
 Ranked 4th in the list of 40 Iranian Universities

U.S. News
 2016:  National rank: 3, international rank: 547
 2015:  National rank: 3, international rank: 472

Round University Ranking (RUR)

According to the last ranking announced by Round University Ranking (RUR), Isfahan University of Technology (IUT) has been ranked as the first Iranian University in Research and International Diversity. IUT also ranked 3rd in overall ranking between 11 Iranian universities which ranked by RUR.

Research and facilities
Isfahan University of Technology was appointed as a Center of Excellence by Iran's Ministry of Science and Technology in the fields of Risk Management and Natural Hazards, Nano Technology in Environment, Steel Technology, Algebra Science, Sensor and Green Chemistry, Soil & Water Pollution, and Oil-seed Crops. This appointment is based on national standing based on research achievements and invested funding in the topics.

A supercomputer was unveiled at the university in 2011. It was made by Isfahan University of Technology scientists and is among the 500 fastest in the world. It has a calculation ability of 34,000 billion operations per second and its graphics processing units are able to perform more than 32 billion operations per 100 seconds.

Notable alumni
 Mohammad-Reza Aref is an Iranian academic, electrical engineer and politician. He was the vice president of Iran under President Mohammad Khatami. He received a bachelor's degree in electronics engineering from University of Tehran and Masters and Ph.D. degrees in electrical and communication engineering from Stanford University in 1975, 1976 and 1980, respectively. Until 1994, Mohammad-Reza Aref was a faculty member of Isfahan University of Technology.
 Mohammad-Ali Najafi is an Iranian politician and university professor in mathematics. He was a minister and later vice-president for planning and budget; he was a member of Tehran City Council from 2007 to 2013 and is currently nominated to the Ministry of Education. After the Iranian revolution of 1979, Najafi returned to Iran. He started working as a consultant to Mostafa Chamran and was later the president of Isfahan University of Technology (1980–1981).
 Esfandiar Rahim Mashaei is an Iranian politician. He was an adviser to the former Iranian president Mahmoud Ahmadinejad and his chief of staff. He was appointed on 31 December 2007 to run the newly founded National Center for Research on Globalization. He is a former head of the Cultural Heritage Organization of Iran. Esfandiar Rahim Mashaei was Vice President of Iran for a short time. He studied electrical engineering and holds a bachelor's degree from Isfahan University of Technology.
 Hamid Baqai is an Iranian politician who has been the head of presidential center from 9 April 2011 to 4 August 2013. He was a senior advisor to President Mahmoud Ahmadinejad. He holds a bachelor's degree in Information Technology from Isfahan University of Technology.
 Mohammad Tabibian is an Iranian economist who served under the administration of Akbar Hashemi Rafsanjani as deputy director of the Planning and Budget Organization. Dr Tabibian was head of the groups who made the First Five Year Plan (1989–1993) and the Second Five Year Plan of Iran (1994–1998). He has taught at the Isfahan University of Technology.
 Ahmad Shirzad was a reformist member of the 6th Iran Parliament (Consultative Assembly of Iran) and a leading official in the Islamic Iran Participation Front, the main reformist party in Iran. He teaches physics in Isfahan University of Technology.
 Amir Faghri is an American professor and leader in the engineering profession as an educator, scientist, and administrator. He is currently Distinguished Professor of Engineering and Distinguished Dean Emeritus of Engineering at the University of Connecticut. Faghri served as head of the Mechanical Engineering Department 1994–1998 and dean of the School of Engineering at the University of Connecticut from 1998 to 2006. He is arguably the world's leading expert in the area of heat pipes and a significant contributor to thermal-fluids engineering in thermal energy systems. He was one of the founding faculty members and administrators who established Isfahan University of Technology in 1977.

Departments

Agriculture
Chemical Engineering
Chemistry
Civil Engineering
Electrical and Computer Engineering
English Language
Industrial Engineering
Materials Engineering
Mathematics
Mechanical Engineering
Mining Engineering
Natural Resources
Physical Education
Physics
Textile Engineering
Golpayegan College of Engineering
Transportation Engineering

Affiliated research centers
 Center for Advanced Computing Services
 Center for Research in Applied Statistics and Stochastic Systems
 Information & Communication Technology Institute
 Network Security Center
 Research Center for soil-less cultivation
 Steel Research Center
 Under Water Research Center

Former Presidents

Gallery

See also
 Higher education in Iran

References

External links 

 
 English Language Center

Educational institutions established in 1977
Buildings and structures in Isfahan
Isfahan University of Technology
Engineering universities and colleges in Iran
1977 establishments in Iran